Alan Breckon is a member of the States of Jersey, was first elected as Deputy of St Saviour No. 2 district in 1993, and was sworn in as Senator 8 December 2008.

He is a member of the Legislation Advisory Panel, and was previously chairman of the Jersey Consumer Council.

Political career
In 2008, Breckon stood unsuccessfully for the office of Chief Minister of Jersey against Senator Terry Le Sueur. In a secret ballot, Breckon received 17 votes from other members, compared to Le Sueur's 36 votes.

References

Living people
Senators of Jersey
Deputies of Jersey
Year of birth missing (living people)